Ozark Courthouse Square Historic District may refer to:

Ozark Courthouse Square Historic District (Ozark, Arkansas), listed on the NRHP in Franklin County, Arkansas
Ozark Courthouse Square Historic District (Ozark, Missouri), listed on the NRHP in Missouri